Lottner is a German surname.  It may refer to:

 Antonia Lottner (b. 1996), a German tennis player.
 Dirk Lottner (b. 1972), a German footballer and coach
 Kurt Lottner (1899–1957), a Generalmajor in the Wehrmacht during World War II.